The Wilhauf House is a historic house at 109 North 3rd Street in Van Buren, Arkansas.  Built in 1838 and restyled in 1847, it is one of the oldest surviving buildings in the state.  It is a single story log dog trot structure, consisting of two log pens originally joined by a breezeway (now closed in).  The house is sheathed in weatherboard, and has a modest Greek Revival gabled portico.  The 1847 alterations included the extension of the gable roof to accommodate additional rooms in the rear, which have been furthered extended by a modern addition.  The house was built by Leonard Wilhauf on land he purchased from John Drennan, Van Buren's first proprietor.

The house was listed on the National Register of Historic Places in 1974.

See also
National Register of Historic Places listings in Crawford County, Arkansas

References

Houses on the National Register of Historic Places in Arkansas
Greek Revival houses in Arkansas
Houses completed in 1838
Houses in Crawford County, Arkansas
National Register of Historic Places in Crawford County, Arkansas
Buildings and structures in Van Buren, Arkansas